Frank Martin may refer to:

Frank Martin (baseball) (1878–1942), American baseball player
Frank Martin (boxer) (born 1995), American boxer
Frank Martin (equestrian) (1885–1962), Swedish horse rider
Frank Martin (composer) (1890–1974), Swiss classical composer
Frank Martin (cricketer) (1893–1967), West Indian cricketer
Frank Martin (sculptor) (1914–2004), British sculptor
Frank Martin (ice hockey) (1933–2007), Canadian ice hockey player
Frank Martin (mayor) (1938–2012), mayor of Columbus, Georgia
Frank Martin (basketball) (born 1966), head men's basketball coach
Frank Martin (Transporter), fictional protagonist in the Transporter series
Frank Martin (councillor), Democratic Alliance councillor in Cape Town, South Africa
Frank Martin (ER character), fictional character on ER
Frank Martin (sport administrator), from Australia
Pancho Martin (Frank Martin, 1925–2012), U.S. Racing Hall of Fame horse trainer
Frank Martin (footballer, born 1887) (1887–1967), English footballer
Frank Martin (Australian footballer) (1895–1969), Australian rules footballer

See also
A. Frank Martin (1894–1982), American founder of Kappa Kappa Psi fraternity
Francis Martin (disambiguation)
Frankie Martin (1908–1988), Canadian boxer
Franklin Martin, American film director, producer, screenwriter (in earlier years, he acted under the shorter name Frank Martin)
Franklin Martins (born 1948), Brazilian journalist